Idu Mishmi may refer to:

 Idu Mishmi tribe of the Mishmi people
 Idu Mishmi language

See also
 All Idu Mishmi Students Union

Language and nationality disambiguation pages